, formerly , is a bimonthly Japanese  manga magazine published by Kadokawa Shoten, aimed at teenage girls. The magazine was established in 1985. It is released on the 24th of every odd-numbered month as of May 2021. Much like its sibling publication Shōnen Ace, it places some emphasis on anime tie-ins and spinoffs. Manga serialized in Asuka are published in  format under the Asuka Comics imprint.

Notable manga artists and series featured in Asuka
Tamayo Akiyama
Hyper Rune
Mouryou Kiden
Secret Chaser
Sumiko Amakawa
Cross
Clamp
Clamp School Detectives
Legal Drug
Shirahime-Syo: Snow Goddess Tales
Suki: A Like Story
Wish
X
Fumino Hayashi
Neon Genesis Evangelion: Angelic Days (spinoff of Neon Genesis Evangelion)
 Akira Hiyoshimaru
Book Girl and the Delicious Recipe
 Book Girl and the Lovesick Poet
 Haruko Iida
Crescent Moon
 Kasane Katsumoto
Hands Off!
 Ayumi Kawahara
Idol Densetsu Eriko
Temari Matsumoto
Kyo Kara MA no Tsuku Jiyuugyou! (based on the Kyo Kara Maoh! series)
Min Min
Neon Genesis Evangelion: Gakuen Datenroku (spinoff of Neon Genesis Evangelion)
 Ai Morinaga
Yamada Tarō Monogatari
 Nakano
Biblia Koshodō no Jiken Techō
 Majiko!, Gorō Taniguchi, and Ichirō Ōkouchi
Code Geass: Lelouch of the Rebellion (spinoff of the anime series Code Geass)
Aya Shouoto
Kiss of Rose Princess
The Demon Prince of Momochi House
Yukiru Sugisaki
D.N.Angel 
Lagoon Engine
Lagoon Engine Einsatz
 Satosumi Takaguchi
Hana no Asuka-gumi!
Sakende Yaruze
Kazusa Takashima
Harlem Beat wa Yoake Made
 Keiko Takemiya
Tenma no Ketsuzoku
 Yōko Tamotsu
Midnight Occult Civil Servants
Setsuri Tsuzuki
Broken Angels
 Cain Yuga
Cowboy Bebop Shooting Star (based on the anime Cowboy Bebop, created by Hajime Yatate)
 Yutaka Nanten and Hajime Yatate
Cowboy Bebop (spinoff/adaptation of the anime series of the same name)
 Kiyo Kujo and Sunao Yoshida
Trinity Blood
 Kairi Yura
Angelique
Saiunkoku Monogatari

Related magazines
 Monthly Asuka Fantasy DX

References

External links
  
 

1985 establishments in Japan
Kadokawa Shoten magazines
Magazines established in 1985
Monthly manga magazines published in Japan
Shōjo manga magazines
Magazines published in Tokyo